

T

T